Roundtable is a pro-Beijing political organisation founded in 2017 by Michael Tien after he quit the New People's Party. The group currently holds one seat in the Legislative Council, occupied by Michael Tien, and seven seats in the District Councils.

The organization was founded after Tien complained that the New People's Party was becoming too close to Beijing.

Although it is aligned with the pro-Beijing camp, Roundtable has found itself at odds the camp on certain issues. One such example is when Tien supported scrapping the pro-Beijing extradition law. Another example is when he supported an independent inquiry into police abuses.

Performance in elections

Legislative Council elections

District Council elections

Representatives

Legislative Council

District Councils

See also
 United Front Work Department
 United Front (China)
 Conservatism in Hong Kong
 New People's Party (Hong Kong)

References

Political organisations based in Hong Kong
2017 establishments in Hong Kong
Conservative parties in Hong Kong